Foley Hall was a historic building located on the campus of Saint Mary-of-the-Woods College in Sugar Creek Township, Vigo County, Indiana. The building consisted of a three-story, three wing, brick structure built in 1860, fronted by a -story, Renaissance Revival style limestone addition built in 1897. The building was topped by a flat roof with a large cupola topped by a spire. It featured a two-story, central pediment supported by Corinthian order columns. Foley Hall was demolished in 1989.

It was listed on the National Register of Historic Places in 1985, and was delisted in 2019.

References

University and college buildings on the National Register of Historic Places in Indiana
Renaissance Revival architecture in Indiana
School buildings completed in 1860
Buildings and structures in Vigo County, Indiana
National Register of Historic Places in Terre Haute, Indiana
1860 establishments in Indiana
1989 disestablishments in Indiana
Buildings and structures demolished in 1989
Former National Register of Historic Places in Indiana